Hauke Fuhlbrügge (born 21 March 1966) is a German former middle-distance runner.

Biography
He won the bronze medal at the 1991 World Championships in Tokyo over 1500 metres. He also won a silver medal at the 1989 World Indoor Championships and a gold medal at the 1987 Summer Universiade. Fuhlbrügge qualified for the Olympic Games in Barcelona 1992 but went out in the semi-finals. He set personal bests of 1:45.15 minutes for 800 metres in 1989 and 3:34.15 minutes for 1500 metres in 1991. The latter result places him tenth on the German all-time performers list, behind Thomas Wessinghage, Harald Hudak, Jens-Peter Herold, Dieter Baumann, Rüdiger Stenzel, Jürgen Straub, Willi Wülbeck and Andreas Busse.

Fuhlbrügge did not participate in the 1993 World Championships as he had come only fourth in the German championships.

Hauke Fuhlbrügge competed for East Germany before reunification and represented the sports club SC Turbine Erfurt.

References 

1966 births
Living people
East German male middle-distance runners
German male middle-distance runners
Athletes (track and field) at the 1992 Summer Olympics
Olympic athletes of Germany
People from Friedrichroda
World Athletics Championships medalists
World Athletics Championships athletes for Germany
Universiade medalists in athletics (track and field)
Sportspeople from Thuringia
Universiade gold medalists for East Germany
World Athletics Indoor Championships medalists
Medalists at the 1987 Summer Universiade